eBeam is an interactive whiteboard system developed by Luidia, Inc. that transforms any standard whiteboard or other surface into an interactive display and writing surface.

Luidia's eBeam hardware and software products allow text, images and video to be projected onto a variety of surfaces, where an interactive stylus or marker can be used to add notes, access control menus, manipulate images and create diagrams and drawings. The presentations, notes and images can be saved and emailed to class or meeting participants, as well as shared in real time on local networks or over the Internet.

eBeam technology has been incorporated into other manufacturers' interactive whiteboard systems, such as the 3M "Wall Display" / Digital Board, Hitachi Starboard, Legamaster eBoard, and NEC's WT615 short throw projection unit.

Technology
eBeam technology uses infrared and ultrasound receivers to track the location of a transmitter-equipped pen, called a stylus, or a standard dry-erase marker in a transmitter-equipped sleeve. A separate receiver unit attaches to the edge of the whiteboard, wall or other writing surface, and determines the distance and direction of the transmitter pen using the known quantities and differences of the speed of light and the speed of sound.

Luidia's eBeam technology was originally developed and patented by engineers at Electronics for Imaging Inc. (Nasdaq: EFII), a Foster City, California, developer of digital print server technology. Luidia was spun off from EFI in July 2003 with venture funding from Globespan Capital Partners and Silicom Ventures.

Since then, Luidia has continued to update and expand its eBeam product line while adding numerous manufacturing partners, including Hitachi, NEC and Uchida.

Products
Luidia offers a variety of eBeam hardware and software products, including:

Interactive whiteboard systems
eBeam Edge and Edge Wireless – this hardware and software package works with digital projectors or displays to create interactive surfaces where users can manipulate and edit all files, websites and applications with an interactive stylus.
eBeam Engage – this product includes the interactive components found in eBeam Edge and also has 18 W speakers, built-in microphone, a two-port USB hub, a scroll knob, and comes standard with the eBeam Wireless Keyboard.
eBeam Capture – this addition to the eBEam Edge and Engage allow users to captures dry erase notes from any whiteboard, save them to a computer, edit and share them.

Interactive software:
eBeam Education Suite – Combines three apps including eBeam Home for organizing files, folders, links and apps, eBeam Scrapbook with unlimited digital whiteboards and built-in curriculum resources and teaching tools including real-time whiteboard sharing, and eBeam Tool Palette a floating circular palette for presenting, annotating, screen recording and sharing notes, presentations, images and web pages on a Mac, Windows or Linux computer.   
eBeam Workspace – Business software for presenting, interacting with and sharing meeting content – includes eBeam Tool Palette.
eBeam Capture – Business and education software for capturing, sharing, editing and distributing traditional white-board content. 
eBeam Connect – Online cloud storage and collaborative environment from any device on the Internet.

Additional products
eBeam Inscribe – Wireless tablet that let users write or perform mouse functions while away from the whiteboard.
eBeam LiveWire – USB Device with auto-launch eBeam software.
eBeam Battery Pack – Attaches to Edge Wireless to provide power to device without any cables.
eBeam Display Bracket – Way to attach an Edge USB or Wireless to a display to create an interactive display.

See also
Office equipment
Display technology
Educational technology

References

External links
Electronics for Imaging (EFI)
Luidia Inc. - eBeam
Luidia website
Google Books results
Review in PC Mag
Review in InfoWorld
VEngineers Co. Ltd (Mauritius)

Office equipment
Display technology